Markus Herbrand (born 24 February 1971) is a German politician of the Free Democratic Party (FDP) who has been serving as a member of the Bundestag from the state of North Rhine-Westphalia since 2017, representing the Euskirchen – Rhein-Erft-Kreis II district.

Early life and career 
After seven years as an assistant tax consultant and auditing assistant, Herbrand passed the tax consultant examination in 1999. He has been practicing as a tax consultant in North Rhine-Westphalia.

Political career 
Herbrand joined the FDP in 2002. In the 2017 federal elections, Herbrand ran for the constituency of Euskirchen - Rhein-Erft-Kreis II and entered the German Bundestag via the state list of the FDP in NRW. In parliament, he is a member of the Finance Committee. In this capacity, he serves as his parliamentary group's rapporteur on measures against money laundering. Since the 2021 elections, he has been serving as his parliamentary group’s spokesperson for financial policy.

Personal life 
Herbrand is married.

References

External links 

 Bundestag biography 
 

1971 births
Living people
Members of the Bundestag for North Rhine-Westphalia
Members of the Bundestag 2017–2021
Members of the Bundestag 2021–2025
Members of the Bundestag for the Free Democratic Party (Germany)